The men's 81 kilograms (half middleweight) competition at the 2010 Asian Games in Guangzhou was held on 14 November at the Huagong Gymnasium.

Schedule
All times are China Standard Time (UTC+08:00)

Results

Main bracket

Final

Top half

Bottom half

Repechage

 Shokir Muminov of Uzbekistan originally won the silver medal, but was disqualified after he tested positive for Methylhexanamine. Masahiro Takamatsu and Islam Bozbayev were raised to joint second and took silver medals.

References

Results

External links
Draw

M81
Judo at the Asian Games Men's Half Middleweight